Hassi Mamèche is a town and commune in Mostaganem Province, Algeria. It is the capital of Hassi Mamèche District. According to the 1998 census it has a population of 21,778.

References

Communes of Mostaganem Province
Mostaganem Province